Gal is a Madang language of Papua New Guinea. It is closely related to Baimak, and sometimes goes by that name.

References

External links 
 Paradisec open access notes about the grammar of Gal (and other Halmahera languages)

Hanseman languages
Languages of Madang Province